Denis Nikolayevich Matiola (born 25 October 1978) is a Russian former professional footballer.

Club career
He made his debut in the Russian Premier League in 1999 for FC Rotor Volgograd and played one game for them in the UEFA Cup 1997–98.

References

1978 births
Living people
People from Kandalaksha
Russian footballers
Russia under-21 international footballers
Association football defenders
FC Rotor Volgograd players
FC KAMAZ Naberezhnye Chelny players
FC Kuban Krasnodar players
FC Baltika Kaliningrad players
Russian Premier League players
FC Volgar Astrakhan players
FC Orenburg players
FC Dynamo Saint Petersburg players
FC Sever Murmansk players
Sportspeople from Murmansk Oblast